The Athens Water Supply and Sewerage Company (Eteria Ydrefsis ke Apohetefsis Protevusas, abbr. , EYDAP) is the largest Greek enterprise in its sector. Based in Galatsi in Athens, it is serving 4.3 million customers in the metropolitan area of Athens with fresh water and 3.5 million customers with sewers.

Company
EYDAP was founded in 1980 after the merge of the two water suppliers Hellenic Water Company (EEY) and Greater Athens Sewerage Organization (OAP).

The Greek state holds a majority stake in EYDAP, with further 27 percent being listed at the Athens Exchange where it belongs to the 25 companies forming the FTSE/Athex Large Cap index.

Following the Greek government-debt crisis, EYDAP was planned to be fully privatized under the terms of the Eurozone Memorandum. In May 2014, the Greek Council of State however blocked the transfer of the government's stake to its privatization fund, the Hellenic Republic Asset Development Fund. The constitutional court ruled that the sale would be unconstitutional. Following this decision, a merger of EYDAP with the Thessaloniki Water Supply & Sewage Co. (EYATH) was taken into consideration instead.

References

External links
  

Companies established in 1980
1980 establishments in Greece
Companies based in Athens
Service companies of Greece
Water companies
Water in Greece
Public utilities of Greece
Companies listed on the Athens Exchange
Galatsi
Water supply and sanitation in Greece